Noga Levy-Rapoport (born 25 November 2001) is an Israeli-born British climate activist, speaker, and volunteer within British climate strikes at the UK Student Climate Network.

Early life 
Noga Levy-Rapoport was born on 25 November 2001 in Tel Aviv. They moved to the UK as a toddler. Levy-Rapoport is non-binary.

Activism 
On 15 February 2019, they participated in London's first climate strike march, before joining the UK Student Climate Network as a volunteer for school outreach and organising around the Green New Deal with GND UK. They helped to organise London climate strikes for global strike dates on 15 March 2019 and 24 May 2019, as well as hosting and publicly announcing UKSCN's support of a Green New Deal for the UK at the London climate strike on 12 April 2019. Since February, the 17-year-old has spoken at numerous panels, events, strikes and protests around the UK.

On 7 May 2019, Noga spoke at the International Maritime Organization in London to call for a limit on shipping speeds in order to reduce emissions alongside the Campaign Against Climate Change group and other activists. The speech was described as 'Greta Thunberg treatment' for the IMO, who, as a UN body, had previously come under fire for not being committed enough to reducing their emissions.

In July 2019, Levy-Rapoport opened the keynote at the annual Children's Media Conference, arguing that the political balance the media had so far tried to place on children's media when producing content that covered climate change was ineffective and potentially paralysing for young people willing to take action on climate change. Described as an "outstanding address", the activist, named as one of CMC's 'Changemakers' of the year, pointedly noted that there was a "global call for the children to become the leaders of today", and this ought to start with their media.

On 20 September 2019, they hosted London's global climate strike, the largest climate mobilisation in UK history, with 100,000 protesters in the capital and 350,000 attending strikes across the country. In the same month, their joint design for a climate strike placard along with ILOVEYOU agency was entered for Beazley's 'Design of the Year' competition at the Design Museum, which Levy-Rapoport and their fellow activists chose not to boycott, a decision she later explained in an article for It's Nice That.

In October 2019, they were selected by the London Evening Standard as one of London's most influential people of 2019 as part of their annual Progress 1000 list. In the same month they discussed the climate crisis and politicians with Clive Lewis for Huck Magazine.

The campaigner has taken on a spokesperson role for the youth climate movement in the UK and has been interviewed for several media outlets, local to national, as well as writing for The Guardian, It's Nice That, and the Fabian Society. Levy-Rapoport is also a spokesperson for Labour for a Green New Deal.

Key media 
 Interview with Nick Ferrari on LBC.
 Interview for My Name Is... on BBC Radio 4.
 Interview for We Can Change The World with Isy Suttie for a podcast on BBC Sounds. 
 Interview for The Guardian on youth activism.
 Interview for the Evening Standard titled 'The opera-singing student leading UK climate strikes'. 
 Interview for GQ Style Magazine profile series. 
 Interview for SLEEK Magazine titled 'Meet the young, British and angry activists reshaping the UK'.
Interview for The Times Magazine titles 'Britain's Greta Thunbergs - the teens of Extinction Rebellion and climate protests'

References

External links 
 Noga Levy-Rapoport on The Guardian

2001 births
Living people
Climate activists
Child activists
People from Tel Aviv
Israeli environmentalists
British environmentalists
Israeli expatriates in the United Kingdom
Jewish British activists
Youth climate activists
Non-binary activists